Procymate (Equipax) is a carbamate derivative which is a sedative and anxiolytic drug. It was previously manufactured and marketed in Belgium. The usual dose for adults is 800 to 1200 mg per day. Procymate shares a similar structure and mechanism of action with the related drugs hexapropymate and phenprobamate.

References

Sedatives
Carbamates
GABAA receptor positive allosteric modulators